The  is a suspended SAFEGE monorail in the cities of Kamakura and Fujisawa in Kanagawa Prefecture, Japan.

Trains run on a  line called the Enoshima Line. It is used by commuters that work in Tokyo or Yokohama, tourists visiting Enoshima, and, in summer months, city dwellers who are visiting the parks or baths of Enoshima.

History
The monorail was built by Mitsubishi Heavy Industries, and the line opened March 7, 1970 between Ōfuna and Nishi-Kamakura. The rest of the line opened on July 1, 1971.

Until 2018, the monorail company was part owned by Keihin Kyuko Electric Railway because the monorail line runs over "Keihin Kyuko Line" which was a toll road operated by Keikyu. Seibu Railway also had investment in the company because Kokudo which was a subsidiary of Seibu Group developed land around Kataseyama Station.

In May 2015, most shares of this monorail line and company were transferred to Michinori Holdings from Mitsubishi Group.

In 2018, this company became a wholly subsidiary company of Michinori Holdings.

The Shonan Monorail is twinned with Wuppertal Schwebebahn since 2018, a suspension railway located in Wuppertal, a city in North Rhine-Westphalia, Germany. Both suspension railways hung down on the rail and are known tourist destinations for Monorail enthusiats. Both suspension railways made a twinning campaign on its doorside in September 2018.

Stations
The Shonan Monorail  travels  every seven to eight minutes between Ōfuna Station and Enoshima, making six stops. The average length of a single trip is 14 minutes. The line's maintenance workshop is located at the Shonan Monorail Headquarters in Kamakura City.

* Track switching possible at these stations

Rolling stock 
 5000 series 3-car sets (since 2004)

, the line is operated using a fleet of seven three-car aluminium-bodied 5000 series trainsets. The 5000 series is equipped with a VVVF control device and regenerative brake which allows for smooth acceleration and deceleration. The VVVF inverter control reduces the need for inspection and maintenance because unlike a DC motor, there is no commutator brush or contact switch.

Former

 300 series 2/3-car sets (from March 1970 until July 1992)
 400 series (from 1980 until July 2004)
 500 series 3-car sets (from 1988 until June 2016)

Services were initially operated using a fleet of six two-car 300 series trainsets built by Mitsubishi Heavy Industries. Two sets were increased to three cars from February 1975 to provide additional capacity. The last of the 300 series sets were withdrawn by July 1992, following the introduction of new 500 series trains. The 500 series trains introduced in 1988 were the first air-conditioned trains on the line. The last 500 series train was withdrawn after its last day in service on 26 June 2016.

See also
 Monorails in Japan
 List of rapid transit systems

References

External links

 Company website in Japanese, with translation available
 Youtube video of riding along the Shonan Monorail

(Ōfuna)(Shōnan-Enoshima)

Monorails
Suspended monorails
SAFEGE people movers
Railway lines opened in 1970
 
Transport in Kanagawa Prefecture